Frank "Frankie" Genaro (born DiGennaro, August 26, 1901 – December 27, 1966) was an American former Olympic gold medalist and a 1928 National Boxing Association (NBA) World flyweight Champion.  He is credited with engaging in 130 bouts, recording 96 victories (19 KO's), 26 losses, 8 draws and 4 No Decisions.

Statistical boxing website BoxRec lists Genaro as the #13 ranked flyweight of all-time, while The Ring magazine founder Nat Fleischer placed him at #3. The International Boxing Research Organization rates Genaro as the 6th best flyweight ever. He was inducted into The Ring magazine Hall of Fame in 1973 and the International Boxing Hall of Fame in 1998.

Early life and amateur career
Before taking up boxing, Genaro's ambition was to become a jockey, but he took up boxing when he tired of cleaning stables awaiting his chance to race horses.  His first amateur bout in 1919 was against Jimmy Nable, which he fought using the ringname A. J. DeVito.  He took the New York State and National Flyweight championships early in his amateur career.

Genaro won the flyweight Gold Medal at the 1920 Olympics in Antwerp on August 24, two days before his 19th birthday.

Olympic results 
 Defeated Einar Nilsen (Norway)
 Defeated Jean Rampignon (France)
 Defeated Charles Albert (France)
 Defeated Anders Pedersen (Denmark)

Pro career
He turned pro that same year and almost immediately was fighting world class flyweights, scoring wins over Charley (Phil) Rosenberg and Pancho Villa. In 1923, he captured the American flyweight title with another win over Villa and decisioned future bantamweight champ Bud Taylor.

NBA world flyweight champion
Genaro lost his American title to Fidel LaBarba in 1925 and dropped a decision to former world champ Newsboy Brown in his next outing.  On October 15, 1928, he defeated Frenchy Belanger in a ten round points decision to win the NBA flyweight crown at Toronto's Colliseum. He then lost the title in his first defense against Émile Pladner, but regained the title when he defeated Pladner in a rematch one month later.

Genaro successfully defended his title against Ernie Jarvis, Yvon Trevidic and Belanger.  He then faced Midget Wolgast, who was recognized as world flyweight champ by the New York State Athletic Commission. The unification bout ended in a draw.  Genaro then went on to successfully defend his title against Victor Ferrand, Jackie Harmon and Valentin Angelmann.  He lost his crown when he was knocked out by Victor "Young" Perez in 1931.

Later career
Genaro's title days were over, but he did beat future featherweight champion Joey Archibald in 1933 before retiring in 1934. During his career Genaro fought 10 world champions and three Hall of Famers. He died in Staten Island, New York, on December 27, 1966, at the age of 65.

Professional boxing record
All information in this section is derived from BoxRec, unless otherwise stated.

Official record

All newspaper decisions are officially regarded as “no decision” bouts and are not counted in the win/loss/draw column.

Unofficial record

Record with the inclusion of newspaper decisions in the win/loss/draw column.

References

External links

 
 International Boxing Hall of Fame – Frankie Genaro

|-

|-

1901 births
1966 deaths
Boxers from New York City
Olympic boxers of the United States
Boxers at the 1920 Summer Olympics
Featherweight boxers
Flyweight boxers
Olympic gold medalists for the United States in boxing
World boxing champions
American people of Italian descent
World flyweight boxing champions
World Boxing Association champions
Winners of the United States Championship for amateur boxers
Medalists at the 1920 Summer Olympics
American male boxers